Chaman (Balochi, Pashto and ) is a city and the headquarters of the Chaman District in Balochistan, Pakistan, located near the Afghanistan-Pakistan border. The district was newly carved out of the Qila Abdullah District. The city is situated just south of the Wesh–Chaman border crossing with the neighbouring Kandahar Province of Afghanistan. After the capital Quetta, Chaman is the fifth-largest city and tehsil in the Pashtun majority northern part of Balochistan, and is also Balochistan's fifth-largest city.

Climate
With an influence from the local steppe climate, Chaman features a hot semi-arid climate (Köppen BSh). The average annual temperature in Chaman is 19.0 °C, while the annual precipitation averages 232 mm. June is the driest month with 0 mm of rainfall, while the wettest month is January, with an average 65 mm of precipitation.

July is the hottest month of the year with an average temperature of 31.0 °C. The coldest month January has an average temperature of 6.4 °C.

Demography

Transport

Chaman has a railway station which accommodates services with Kandahar as well as other parts of Afghanistan. A slow passenger train runs between Chaman and Quetta daily. In 2008, it was proposed to extend this railway through Afghanistan to Central Asia. Chaman is on the silk road on the eastern side.

Trade
The town is an important trade point in the Balochistan region, providing a gateway on the trade routes between Afghanistan and Karachi. It underwent development during the martial law period of the 1980s. People of the city import many things like cars, motor bikes, motor rickshaws. Japanese, Chinese and UAE phones, cosmetics, perfumes, and many other consumer goods from Afghanistan into Pakistan.

Afghanistan War and terrorism
Chaman has been used by NATO forces as a major supply route into Afghanistan since 2000.

On 30 August 2009, an attack on a NATO convoy destroyed 20 fuel tankers and other supply trucks. The attackers reportedly fired rockets and small arms before destroying the trucks.

Thousands of Afghan refugees enter Pakistan via the Chaman route on a regular basis.

Bombings occurred in 2017, 2020 Chaman bombing, and 2021.

In December 2022, Afghan Taliban forces launched indiscriminate fire at the Chaman border, twice in a week and caused civilian casualties on the Pakistani side.

Notable people
Asghar Khan Achakzai, President of the Awami National Party
Waheed Khan Achakzai, Prominent Pashto Singer

 Jafar Khan Achakzai, 
Ex-Adisor to the chairman PTI Imran khan.

Journalist 
Dilbar khan 
Press club chaman

Notes

References

Chaman District
Populated places in Balochistan, Pakistan